Vanxains is a commune in the Dordogne department in Nouvelle-Aquitaine in southwestern France.  The Château de la Brangelie is located just southeast of the village.

Population

Sights
Château de la Brangelie
Château Trompette

See also
Communes of the Dordogne department

References

Communes of Dordogne
Dordogne communes articles needing translation from French Wikipedia